Muhammed Seif Khatib (10 January 1951 – 15 February 2021) was a Tanzanian CCM politician and Member of Parliament for Uzini constituency since 1995.

Career
Khatib was the National Youth Chairman of the Chama Cha Mapinduzi (CCM) from 1978 to 1983 and was a member of the CCM's National Executive Council from 1978 to 2002. After serving as Minister of State in the Prime Minister's Office responsible for Information, he was appointed Minister of Information, Culture and Sports in the Cabinet named on 4 January 2006. Subsequently, he was named Minister in the Vice-President's Office for Union Affairs on 12 February 2008.

References

1951 births
2021 deaths
Tanzanian Muslims
Chama Cha Mapinduzi MPs
Tanzanian MPs 2010–2015
Kivukoni College alumni
University of Dar es Salaam alumni
Alumni of SOAS University of London
University of Dodoma alumni